This is a list of contestants in the Miss Venezuela pageant:

1975- María Conchita Alonso (actress & singer)
1980- Hilda Abrahamz (actress)
1980- Mariángel Ruiz (actress & TV host)
1981- Pilín León (writer)
1982- Michelle Shoda (actress & businesswoman)
1984- Astrid Carolina Herrera (actress)
1986- Maite Delgado (TV host)
1986- Catherine Fulop (actress)
1986- Dayana Mendoza (actress)
1987- Viviana Gibelli (TV host, actress & singer)
1987- Inés María Calero (actress)
1987- Viviana Gibelli (TV host, actress & singer)
1989- Fabiola Candosin (author & actress)
1989- Carolina Omaña (actress)
1993- Maria Daniela Barrios (Fashion Designer)
2008- Stefanía Fernández, (TV host)
2011- Irene Esser, (actress)
2012- Gabriela Isler, (TV host)

Miss Venezuela contestants
Miss Venezuela contestants